Kraig Metzinger (born March 19, 1963) is an American former child actor, who played the role of Maude Findlay's grandson Phillip Traynor on the sitcom Maude for the show's final season in 1977–1978. He was born in Los Angeles, California. Metzinger took over that role from Brian Morrison, who had played the character for the first five seasons.

Prior to Maude, Metzinger was a regular in the cast of the short-lived 1976 CBS series Sara.

Filmography

External links

1963 births
Living people
American male television actors
Male actors from Los Angeles
American male child actors
20th-century American male actors